The sporting man culture involves men leading hedonistic lifestyles that include keeping mistresses as well excessive eating, drinking, smoking, gambling, and big game hunting. It is applied to a large group of middle- and upper-class men in the mid-19th century, most often in Great Britain and the United States. The definition has little to do with actually playing sports.  Edward VII and his companion "Sporting Joe" Aylesford are regarded as practitioners of the sporting man culture.

See also

Joseph Caulfield James

Further reading

References

Sports culture
Drinking culture
Men's culture
Gambling terminology
Smoking